Burton is an unincorporated community and census-designated place in Adams County about four miles east of Quincy.

Burton was platted ca. 1836. A post office called Burton was established in 1840, and remained in operation until 1922.

Geography 

Demographics
As of the 2020 census there were 103 people, 27 households, and 13 families residing in the CDP. The racial makeup of the CDP was 98.06% White, 0.97% Pacific Islander, and 0.97% from two or more races.

See also
 List of unincorporated communities in Illinois

Notes and references

External links
 Adams County website

Unincorporated communities in Adams County, Illinois
Quincy, Illinois micropolitan area
Unincorporated communities in Illinois